Poignard was one of 10 s built for the French Navy in the first decade of the 20th century.

Poignard collided with the battleship  on 6 September 1911 during manoeuvers off Hyères.

References

Footnotes

Bibliography

 

Branlebas-class destroyers
Ships built in France
1909 ships
Maritime incidents in 1911